The Holbrook News was a newspaper established in Holbrook, Arizona in 1909.  Its founder and initial editor was Sidney Sapp.  The paper ceased publication when it merged with The Holbrook Tribune in 1923, and began to be published under the title, Holbrook Tribune and Holbrook News, edited by V. P. Richards.  The Tribune had begun publication in 1918.  The combined paper continued in publication until January 1934.

References

Publications established in 1909
Weekly newspapers published in the United States
Defunct newspapers published in Arizona
1920s disestablishments in Arizona
1909 establishments in Arizona Territory
Publications disestablished in 1923